Kazakhstan competed at the 2006 Winter Olympics in Turin, Italy.
Their largest contingent was their ice hockey squad of 23, in which Kazakhstan qualified after winning a qualifying series also including Austria, France and Ukraine. The cross country skiing team was also sizeable, with of 19 Kazakh athletes entered.

Alpine skiing

Biathlon

Cross-country skiing 

Distance

Men

Women

Sprint

Freestyle skiing

Ice hockey

Men's 

Players

Round-robin

Ski jumping

Speed skating

References 

 

Nations at the 2006 Winter Olympics
2006
2006 in Kazakhstani sport